Below is a list of episodes from What's Happening Now!!, a sitcom that aired in first run syndication from 1985 to 1988.

Series overview

Episodes

Season 1 (1985–86)

Season 2 (1986–87)

Season 3 (1987–88)

External links

Lists of American sitcom episodes